The Cal Poly Humboldt Lumberjacks are the 11 varsity athletic teams that represent California State Polytechnic University, Humboldt, located in Arcata, California, in NCAA Division II intercollegiate sports. The Lumberjacks compete as an associate member of the California Collegiate Athletic Association for all sports except women's rowing, which competes in the Great Northwest Athletic Conference.

Varsity sports

Basketball
Recently the men's basketball team achieved its first-ever West Region title and advancement to the semifinals of the NCAA Division II for the first time in the program's 81-year history.

The men's head coach is Tae Norwood, and the women's head coach is Michelle Bento-Jackson.

Softball
CPH's softball team has qualified for the NCAA post-season 18 times between 1990 and 2008, capturing the national championship in 1999 and in 2008.

Rowing 
The women's rowing team claimed the NCAA Division II national rowing championship title in 2012 and 2014. In 2012 they took first in both the varsity 8 and varsity 4 boats. In 2014 the varsity 8 was first, and the varsity 4 took third. In 2011 the team finished third overall at the national championships, placing second in the varsity 4 and third in the varsity 8. The women's rowing program advanced both its varsity 4 and varsity 8 boats to the NCAA Championships in 2004, with the varsity 4 earning the individual boat national title and the varsity 8 placing second at nationals. Women's rowing became an intercollegiate sport at Humboldt State in 1994.

1994 Club Sport Emerges as an NCAA Division II Intercollegiate Team

2003 NCAA Division II National Championships ~ Finalist

2004  Division II National Championships ~ Finalist / National Champions 4+

2010 WIRA Team Champions

2011 NCAA Division II National Championships ~ Finalist

2012 NCAA Division II National Champions

2014 NCAA Division II National Champions

2015 NCAA Division II National Championships ~ Finalist

2017 WIRA Team Champions

2018 WIRA Team Champions

2019 WIRA Team Champions

Track and field
The Lumberjacks have produced national champions and All-Americans in cross country and track and field. In 1980, the school's first year in Division II, the CPH men's cross country team claimed a national title. A year later, cross country runner Mark Conover earned the individual crown and later represented the US as a marathoner in the 1988 Summer Olympic Games.  The women's track and field team, led by future 1928 Olympic sprinter, Elta Cartwright, won the 1926 national championship meet conducted in telegraphic form by the Women's National Collegiate and Scholastic Track Association.

Football

Humboldt State won the Great Northwest Athletic Conference in 2011 and 2015. The championship in 2015 led them to the Division II playoffs, during which they made it to the second round before losing to eventual champion Northwest Missouri State. The Lumberjacks played their home games in the Redwood Bowl. Their biggest rivals in football were Western Oregon and Azusa Pacific. The university dropped football in 2018.

Head coach
Humboldt State has been coached by Rob Smith since the 2008 season. Coach Smith has accumulated 55 wins as the head coach of the Lumberjacks.

2015 season
The 2015 season was one of the most successful in Humboldt State history. The Lumberjacks won 10 games, 9 in the regular season, en route to a perfect 6–0 GNAC record, and the conference championship. For the first time in school history, CPH hosted an NCAA Division II home playoff game, played against Augustana University. The Lumberjacks defeated Augustana by a score of 45–31 to secure the first DII playoff victory since 1960. They lost their second round matchup with top seed and eventual champion Northwest Missouri State 54–7.

The season saw individual success as well, as running back Ja'Quan Gardner was named an All-American and finished as the runner-up in the Harlon Hill Trophy, the Division II version of the Heisman Trophy. Gardner rushed for 2,266 yards on 337 carries, both GNAC records. Gardner also led the country in rushing yards per game (188.8) and rushing touchdowns (25). Gardner won the GNAC Offensive Player of the Year award, and set a school record for single-game rushing yards by running for 305 yards against Azusa Pacific. Offensive Lineman Alex Cappa was named the conference Offensive Lineman of the Year award for the second straight season, and was a second-team All-American.

Conferences
1924–1939: Independent
1940–1996: Northern California Athletic Conference
1997: Division II Independent
1998–2000: Columbia Football Association
2001–2005: Great Northwest Athletic Conference
2006–2007: Division II Independent
2008–2018: Great Northwest Athletic Conference

Discontinuation of football program

In July 2018, the university announced that the football program would be discontinued after the 2018 season.

Championships

NCAA appearances
The Humboldt State Lumberjacks competed in the NCAA Tournament across 12 active sports (5 men's and 7 women's), 113 times at the Division II level.

 Men's basketball (14): 1983,  1990,  2001,  2002,  2003,  2004,  2006,  2007,  2008,  2009,  2010,  2011,  2012,  2016
 Women's basketball (6): 1995,  2006,  2009,  2010,  2015,  2018
 Men's cross country (12): 1969,  1974,  1980,  1989,  1990,  1991,  1992,  1993,  1996,  1998,  2000,  2012
 Women's cross country (5): 1994,  1995,  1996,  2001,  2012
 Football (1): 2015
 Rowing (5): 2004,  2011,  2012,  2014,  2015
 Women's soccer (1): 1996
 Softball (24): 1990,  1991,  1993,  1994,  1995,  1996,  1997,  1998,  1999,  2000,  2001,  2002,  2003,  2004,  2005,  2006,  2007,  2008,  2009,  2013,  2014,  2015,  2016,  2017
 Men's indoor track and field (1): 2000
 Women's indoor track and field (2): 1995,  1999
 Men's outdoor track and field (27): 1965,  1967,  1968,  1969,  1970,  1971,  1972,  1973,  1974,  1981,  1982,  1983,  1986,  1989,  1990,  1991,  1992,  1997,  1998,  2002,  2006,  2007,  2008,  2009,  2011,  2014,  2018
 Women's outdoor track and field (15): 1988,  1990,  1991,  1992,  1993,  1994,  1995,  1996,  1997,  2001,  2006,  2007,  2008,  2010,  2017

Team

NCAA
During the program's existence as Humboldt State, the Lumberjacks earned 5 NCAA team championships at the Division II level.
 Men's (1)
Cross country (1): 1980
 Women's (4)
Rowing (2): 2012, 2014
Softball (2): 1999, 2008

Results

Other national
 Women's Track & Field (1): 1926, at the highest level

Below is one national club team championship:

 Women's disc golf (1): 2014 (NCDGU)

Individual
Cal Poly Humboldt has had 18 athletes win NCAA individual championships at the Division II level.

References

External links